Minnesota State Highway 44 (MN 44) is a highway in southeast Minnesota, which runs from its         
intersection with U.S. 52 in Canton Township, near Prosper, and continues east to its eastern terminus at its intersection with State Highway 16 in Hokah, near La Crescent.

Route description
Highway 44 serves as an east–west route between Mabel, Spring Grove, Caledonia, and Hokah in southeast Minnesota.

The section of Highway 44 between Caledonia and Hokah passes through the Richard J. Dorer State Forest.

Highway 44 runs concurrent with State Highway 76 for three miles at Caledonia.

Beaver Creek Valley State Park is located near the junction of Highways 44 and 76 at the north edge of Caledonia.  The park entrance is located four miles west on County Road 1 via Highway 76.

History
Highway 44 was authorized in 1920.  The route was paved in its entirety by 1940.

The route was originally designated as an auto trail named the Southern Minnesota Air Line in a 1919 application.  The Southern Minnesota Air Line continued west from Preston to the South Dakota state line on a route that later followed old U.S. Highway 16.

At one time, Highway 44 had continued farther west, extending over what is now County Highway 44 in Fillmore County.  The section of present-day County 44 between Harmony and U.S. Highway 63 (south of Spring Valley) was designated Highway 44 between 1972 and 1995.

Major intersections

References

*Steve Riner Details of Routes 26 to 50. Unofficial Minnesota Highways Page. Accessed January 21, 2008.

044
Transportation in Fillmore County, Minnesota
Transportation in Houston County, Minnesota